LPFT is an acronym that can refer to:
 the lowest possible fluid temperature in a piping system or pressure vessel
 the low pressure fuel turbopump of a space shuttle hydrogen fuel system
 the local polynomial Fourier transform, which is a high-order generalization of the short-time Fourier transform